Breaking the Limits is a 2017 Polish biographical film directed by Łukasz Palkowski about the life of Jerzy Górski. The film stars Jakub Gierszał as Górski. Film shows how Gorski manage to win the double Iron Man triathlon after years of being drug addict. In this inspirational film we get to know Gorski from the very beginning, at the onset of his addition to drugs. But along with rising action, main character becomes more and more addicted and lose his best friend and soon, a lover. It's during the second half of movie when he decides to change and fight his demons. For his mother, himself, new lover and most important his daughter which was left without mother after his girlfriend died from overdose. However leaving your addiction is much more harder than winning the biggest triathlon...

Cast
Jakub Gierszał as Jerzy Górski
 as Ewa Meller
Anna Próchniak as Grażyna
Arkadiusz Jakubik as swimming pool manager
Janusz Gajos as Marek Kotański
Artur Żmijewski as Jerzy's father
Magdalena Cielecka as Jerzy's mother
Adam Woronowicz as Grażyna's father
Szymon Piotr Warszawski as Paweł
Mateusz Kościukiewicz as Andrzej
Tomasz Kot as Okoń
Delfina Wilkońska as Halina
Jakub Zając as Krzysiek
Zbigniew Paterak as Wolski

Awards
The film has won a total of six awards at the 42nd Polish Film Festival in Gdynia.

External links

2017 biographical drama films
Polish biographical drama films
Films set in Poland
2017 drama films
Triathlon films
Biographical films about sportspeople
2010s Polish-language films
Films directed by Łukasz Palkowski